Leo Monahan (1933) is an artist who is known for paper art. Monahan creates paper sculptures and multi-dimensional art work that cannot be represented on a two dimensional flat canvas. Monahan was involved with Chouinard Art Institute. Monahan was the first person to receive a Disney Scholarship to attend the Chouinard Art Institute and after graduation he worked for Disney for 50 years. Leo is an educator who teaches collage and  assemblage, conveying basic design principles in an engaging manner. He is a master of color. He highlights the concepts of elements in relation to one another and the power of symbols. He is also proficient at the art of haiku.

Education
Chouinard Art Institute 1954-1958

Career
Monahan was a Graphic Artist in L.A. for years. He designed over 1200 record album covers. Leo created his first paper sculpture in 1960. Since that time he became a pioneer of paper sculpture which he refers to as "Paper in Dimension".

Monahan has worked for Toyota, Coca-Cola, and Nintendo.

One of his works is in the permanent collection of the Smithsonian Institution.  

Monahan has served as a president of the Society of Illustrators of Los Angeles.

Awards
Life Time Achievement award from the Society of Illustrators of Los Angeles 
Life Time Achievement award California Institute of the Arts (2019)

Personal
Monahan grew up in South Dakota. He served in the Korean War.

See also 
Leo Monahan
Chouinard foundation
Multidimensional art

References

1933 births
Living people
People from Lead, South Dakota
Chouinard Art Institute alumni
20th-century American artists
21st-century American artists
Artists from South Dakota